Lee Adams (born 1924) is an American lyricist best known for his musical theatre collaboration with Charles Strouse

Lee or Leigh Adams may also refer to:

Lee Adams (performance artist) (born 1970), British performance artist, curator and experimental film maker
Leigh Adams (born 1971), Australian motorcycle speedway rider
Leigh Adams (footballer) (born 1988), Australian rules footballer

See also
Adams (surname)